Delny railway station served the hamlet of Delny, Ross-shire, Scotland from 1864 to 1964 on the Inverness and Ross-shire Railway.

History 
The station opened on 1 June 1864 by the Inverness and Aberdeen Junction Railway.  The station was closed to passengers on 13 June 1960 and completely in 1964.

References

External links 

Disused railway stations in Ross and Cromarty
Former Highland Railway stations
Railway stations in Great Britain opened in 1864
Railway stations in Great Britain closed in 1960
1864 establishments in Scotland
1964 disestablishments in Scotland